Celia Díaz-Laurel (May 29, 1928–July 12, 2021) was a Filipina theatre actress, singer and painter.
She was the wife of former Vice President Salvador Laurel. She was also the grandmother of actress Denise Laurel.

Early life and career
Maria Luz Celia Teresita Díaz y Franco was born on May 29, 1928 in Talisay, Negros Occidental to Anselmo Sison Diaz and Concepcion Gonzalez Franco. She was the youngest of six children. Her family moved to Manila when she was five. She studied at the Assumption Convent, where she was first exposed to stage performance.  

She studied Fine Arts at the University of the Philippines where she was mentored by National Artists for Visual Arts Fernando Amorsolo and Guillermo Tolentino. 

She then went on to pursue a Masters in Fine Arts at Yale University, joining her husband Salvador “Doy” Laurel (who was later to become Vice-President of the Philippines) who was working on his master’s degree in Law at the same university at that time. Diaz-Laurel later detoured to the Yale School of Drama following an impressive interview conducted by a school official.

Celia has written several books (one dedicated to her husband Salvador, and the other to her grandfather Domingo Franco, one of 13 martyrs executed at Bagumbayan). She became an accomplished painter with a book chronicling her many works, stage actress, and later in life, a production and costume set designer.

Death
Celia died on July 12, 2021 due to complications from a stroke. She is survived by her children, Susana, Celine, Victor, David, Lorenzo, and Marissa, and 19 grandchildren. She was 93 years old.

References

1928 births
2021 deaths
Filipino actresses
Filipino singers
University of the Philippines alumni
Actresses from Negros Occidental